Arenibacterium is a bacterial genus from the family Rhodobacteraceae.

References

Rhodobacteraceae
Bacteria genera
Taxa described in 2020